Jan Firlej (c. 1521, Dąbrowica, Lublin County – 1574, Kock) was a Polish nobleman (szlachcic), and Calvinist activist.

Jan became Great Marshal of the Crown in 1563 and starost of Kraków in 1572. He agreed with the candidature of Henryk Walezy for the Polish throne only on the condition that Henryk signing the Henrican articles. Voivode of Bełz, Lublin and Kraków.

Around 1555 he founded a Calvinist church in Kock, and build a family residence there.

References

1521 births
1574 deaths
People from Lublin County
Polish Calvinist and Reformed Christians
Polish nobility
Marshals of Poland
Jan